Sziklai or Sziklay is a surname. Notable people with the surname include:

 Arnold Sziklay (fl.  1896), the first Hungarian filmmaker
 George Clifford Sziklai (1909–1998), Hungarian-American electronics engineer
 Sziklai pair
 Johann Sziklai (born 1947), poet and teacher

Hungarian-language surnames